Kesley is an unincorporated community in southwestern Butler County, Iowa, United States.  It lies along local roads southwest of the city of Allison, the county seat of Butler County.  Its elevation is 1,001 feet (305 m).  Although Kesley is unincorporated, it has a post office with the ZIP code of 50649.

History
A post office has been in operation in Kesley since 1900. The community was named for Kesley Green, a local farmer.

Kesley's population in 1915 was 52.

References

Unincorporated communities in Butler County, Iowa
Unincorporated communities in Iowa